The Drayton Arms is a Grade II listed public house at 153 Old Brompton Road, Earls Court, London.

It was built in the late 19th century, and the architect is not known.

References

Grade II listed buildings in the Royal Borough of Kensington and Chelsea
Grade II listed pubs in London
Pubs in the Royal Borough of Kensington and Chelsea
Earls Court